Britain's Next Top Model, Cycle 4 is the fourth cycle of Britain's Next Top Model. The cycle, like the previous cycles, was aired on SkyLiving. The cycle was said to be bigger, better and bustier than ever before. The cycle was revolutionary for its time in that it featured shorter girls with heavier set frames and a larger bust.

There were major changes in this cycle. The winner's prize changed and the judging panel also received a change; Icelandic reality TV star hopeful Huggy Ragnarsson and Gerry Deveaux replaced two of the former judges, Paula Hamilton and Jonathan Phang.

This is the only cycle to feature a cast of 14 contestants (as finalists) until Cycle 6, rather than the usual 12 or 13. The international destination during this cycle was South Africa. The winner's prize was a contract with Models 1, a Max Factor Comestics campaign and a 6-page spread and cover of Company Magazine.

The winner was 18-year-old Alex Evans from Cranleigh, Surrey, who battled against a moderately severe anger problem and height defect to emerge triumphant.

Runner-up Catherine Thomas participated as a contestant on America's Next Top Model, Cycle 18 along with six other former BNTM contestants. Thomas was eliminated in the 9th episode after failing to impress at panel.

Contestants
(ages stated are at time of contest)

Summaries

Call-out order

 The contestant was eliminated
 The contestants were in the bottom two, but nobody was eliminated
 The contestant won the competition

Average  call-out order
Final two is not included.

Bottom two 

  The contestant was eliminated after her first time in the bottom two
  The contestant was eliminated after her second time in the bottom two
  The contestant was eliminated after her third time in the bottom two
  The contestant was eliminated in the final judging and placed as the runner-up

Photo Shoot Guide
Episode 1 Photoshoot: Topless in Pairs
Episode 2 Photoshoot: Girl's Night Out
Episode 3 Photoshoot: Canine Couture
Episode 4 Photoshoot: Posing with Lotus Cars
Episode 5 Photoshoot: The 10 Commandments of Fashion
Episode 6 Photoshoot: Music Album Covers
Episode 7 Commercial & Photoshoot: QVC Jewelry; 18th Century Queens
Episode 8 Photoshoot: Mannequins 
Episode 9 Photoshoot: Olympic Sports
Episode 10 Photoshoots: Company Magazine Cover; Max Factor Beauty Shots
Episode 11 Photoshoot: African Tribe Couture Warriors
Episode 12 Photoshoot: Fake Bake Tanning with African Animals in Safari

Judges
 Lisa Snowdon
 Huggy Ragnarsson
 Gerry DeVeaux

Ratings
Episode Viewing figures from BARB

References

External links
Britain's Next Top Model 4 Official Site

https://web.archive.org/web/20080408073602/http://www.mykindaplace.com/fashion/model/

04
2008 British television seasons
Television shows filmed in England
Television shows filmed in South Africa